Mayrouba (also spelled Meyrouba or Mairouba) is a village and municipality in the Keserwan District of the Keserwan-Jbeil Governorate in Lebanon. Mayrouba's inhabitants are almost predominantly Maronite Catholic. As of 2008, the village had a school with 50 pupils and seven businesses with over five employees.

There are several Stone Age archaeological sites in the vicinity that have defined the location as the type site of the Mayroubian culture.

Archaeology

Mayrouba I
It was discovered by Paulist Fathers from Harissa. Collections were made from the site by P.R. Gigues and various Jesuits including Maurice Tallon, Auguste Bergy, Francis Hours and Henri Fleisch. Fleisch admitted that it was not the best choice for a type site due to the possibility of mixed industries however he published it as a transitional site with successive occupations between peoples of the Middle Paleolithic and Upper Paleolithic.

Finds of predominantly blue-grey Upper Jurassic flints included an emphasized Upper Paleolithic element with finds of two Emireh points by Lorraine Copeland and R. Khawam in 1965. Artefacts included numerous burins, end scrapers, thick blades, steep scrapers, bladelet cores, tortoise cores, discoid cores, point cores and miniature flake cores. Collections from the site have been dispersed but a large number have been retained by Saint Joseph University.

Mayrouba II

Mayrouba III
It was found by Francis Hours in 1964 and determined as a Mayroubian site and lies undisturbed amongst pines.

Mayrouba IV

A collection was made by Hours, Jacques Tixier and Lorraine Copeland in 1965 of mostly cores and burins but including an Emireh point. It lies undisturbed amongst screes.

Mayrouba V
It was found by Francis Hours in 1964, determined as a Mayroubian site and lies undisturbed.

Mayrouba VI
It was found undisturbed in 1965 by Francis Hours, Jacques Tixier and Lorraine Copeland. The tools found indicated it to be a Mayroubian site and included an Emireh point, they are held by the Museum of Lebanese Prehistory.

References

External links
 Localiban Entry for Mayrouba

Populated places in Keserwan District
Maronite Christian communities in Lebanon
Archaeological sites in Lebanon
Mayroubian sites